Westren is a surname. Notable people with the surname include:

Ryan Westren (born 1984), Cornish rugby union player  
Herbert Westren Turnbull (1885–1961), English mathematician

See also
Westen